Toilet paper (sometimes called toilet tissue or bathroom tissue) is a tissue paper product primarily used to clean the anus and surrounding anal region of feces (after defecation), and to clean the external genitalia and perineal area of urine (after urination, primarily for females) or other bodily fluids (after menstruation or ejaculation). It also acts as a layer of protection for the hands during these processes. It is usually supplied as a long strip of perforated paper wrapped around a paperboard core for storage in a dispenser near a toilet. The bundle, or roll of toilet paper, is known as a toilet roll,  or loo roll or bog roll in Britain.

There are other uses for toilet paper, as it is a readily available household product. It can be used like facial tissue for blowing the nose or wiping the eyes. Some women may use the paper to absorb the bloody discharge that comes out of the vagina during menstruation. It can be used to wipe off sweat or absorb it. Toilet paper can be used in cleaning like a less abrasive paper towel. As a prank, toilet papering is a form of temporary vandalism by adolescents and often directed at someone who has to clean up the mess.

Most modern toilet paper in the developed world is designed to decompose in septic tanks, whereas some other bathroom and facial tissues are not. Wet toilet paper rapidly decomposes in the environment. Toilet paper comes in various numbers of plies (layers of thickness), from one- to six-ply, with more back-to-back plies providing greater strength and absorbency. Some people have a preference for whether the orientation of the roll on a dispenser should be over or under.

The use of paper for hygiene has been recorded in China in the 6th century AD, with specifically manufactured toilet paper being mass-produced in the 14th century. Modern commercial toilet paper originated in the 19th century, with a patent for roll-based dispensers being made in 1883.

History

Although paper had been known as a wrapping and padding material in China since the 2nd century BC, a reference to the use of toilet paper dates back as early as circa 589 when the scholar-official Yan Zhitui (531–591) wrote:

During the later Tang dynasty (618–907 AD), an Arab traveller to China in the year 851 AD remarked:

During the early 14th century, it was recorded that in what is now Zhejiang alone, ten million packages of 1,000 to 10,000 sheets of toilet paper were manufactured annually. During the Ming dynasty (1368–1644 AD), it was recorded in 1393 that an annual supply of 720,000 sheets of toilet paper (approximately ) were produced for the general use of the imperial court at the capital of Nanjing. From the records of the Imperial Bureau of Supplies of that same year, it was also recorded that for the Hongwu Emperor's imperial family alone, there were 15,000 sheets of special soft-fabric toilet paper made, and each sheet of toilet paper was perfumed.

Elsewhere, wealthy people wiped themselves with wool, lace or hemp, while less wealthy people used their hand when defecating into rivers, or cleaned themselves with various materials such as rags, wood shavings, leaves, grass, hay, stones, sand, moss, water, snow, ferns, plant husks, fruit skins, seashells, or corncobs, depending upon the country and weather conditions or social customs. In Ancient Rome, a sponge on a stick was commonly used, and, after use, placed back in a pail of vinegar. Several talmudic sources indicating ancient Jewish practice refer to the use of small pebbles, often carried in a special bag, and also to the use of dry grass and of the smooth edges of broken pottery jugs (e.g., Shabbat 81a, 82a, Yevamot 59b). These are all cited in the classic Biblical and Talmudic Medicine by the German physician Julius Preuss (Eng. trans. Sanhedrin Press, 1978).

The 16th-century French satirical writer François Rabelais, in Chapter XIII of Book 1 of his novel sequence Gargantua and Pantagruel, has his character Gargantua investigate a great number of ways of cleansing oneself after defecating. Gargantua dismisses the use of paper as ineffective, rhyming that: "Who his foul tail with paper wipes, Shall at his ballocks leave some chips." (Sir Thomas Urquhart's 1653 English translation). He concludes that "the neck of a goose, that is well downed" provides an optimum cleansing medium.

The rise of publishing by the eighteenth century led to the use of newspapers and cheap editions of popular books for cleansing. Lord Chesterfield, in a letter to his son in 1747, told of a man who purchased

In many parts of the world, especially where toilet paper or the necessary plumbing for disposal may be unavailable or unaffordable, toilet paper is not used. Also, in many parts of the world people consider using water a much cleaner and more sanitary practice than using paper. Cleansing is then performed with other methods or materials, such as water, for example using a bidet, a lota, rags, sand, leaves (including seaweed), corn cobs, animal furs, sticks or hands; afterwards, hands are washed with water and possibly soap.

As a commodity
Joseph Gayetty is widely credited with being the inventor of modern commercially available toilet paper in the United States.  Gayetty's paper, first introduced in 1857, was available as late as the 1920s. Gayetty's Medicated Paper was sold in packages of flat sheets, watermarked with the inventor's name. Original advertisements for the product used the tagline "The greatest necessity of the age! Gayetty's medicated paper for the water-closet."

Seth Wheeler of Albany, New York, obtained the earliest United States patents for toilet paper and dispensers, the types of which eventually were in common use in that country, in 1883. Toilet paper dispensed from rolls was popularized when the Scott Paper Company began marketing it in 1890.

The manufacturing of this product had a long period of refinement, considering that as late as the 1930s, a selling point of the Northern Tissue company was that their toilet paper was "splinter free". The widespread adoption of the flush toilet increased the use of toilet paper, as heavier paper was more prone to clogging the trap that prevents sewer gases from escaping through the toilet.

Softer, two ply toilet roll was introduced in Britain in 1942, by St Andrew Mills in Walthamstow; this became the famous Andrex.

Moist toilet paper, called wet wipes, was first introduced in the United Kingdom by Andrex in the 1990s. It has been promoted as being a better method of cleaning than dry toilet paper after defecation, and may be useful for women during menstruation. It was promoted as a flushable product but it has been implicated in the creation of fatbergs; by 2016 some municipalities had begun education campaigns advising people not to flush used wet wipes.

More than seven billion rolls of toilet paper are sold yearly in the United States. Americans use an average of 23.6 rolls per capita per year.
 
In 1973, Johnny Carson joked in his Tonight Show monologue about comments made by Wisconsin congressman Harold V. Froehlich about the possibility of a toilet paper shortage. Subsequently, consumers purchased abnormal amounts, causing an actual shortage in the United States for several months.

Toilet paper has been one of the commodities subject to shortages in Venezuela starting in the 2010s; the government seized one toilet paper factory in a failed effort to resolve the problem.

During the COVID-19 pandemic, toilet paper shortages were reported in March 2020 in multiple countries due to hoarding and panic buying. At first, few believed the pandemic would be serious. Later, people realized they might need to stock up on certain items in case of a shelter-in-place order, or in case they did not know how long such an order would last; suppliers could not assure that they could keep up with demand. However, manufacturers continued to produce even more than they had before. Demand was higher for the types of toilet paper used at home because so many people were at home who would have used toilet paper away from home. In some countries the bidet was already seen as a solution, and a survey before the pandemic had indicated an increasing number of Americans would be interested.

In 2022, British toilet paper packaging started displaying bowel cancer symptoms following campaigning from blogger and journalist Deborah James, who later died from the disease in June 2022. Andrex were the first brand to take the lead on the matter, then various supermarkets followed suit.

Description
Toilet paper is available in several types of paper, a variety of patterns, decorations, and textures, and it may be moistened or perfumed, although fragrances sometimes cause problems for users who are allergic to perfumes. The average measures of a modern roll of toilet paper is c. 10 cm (3 in.) wide, and 12 cm (4 in.) in diameter, and weighs about 227 grams (8 oz.). An alternative method of packing the sheets uses interleaved sheets in boxes, or in bulk for use in dispensers. "Hard" single-ply paper has been used as well as soft multi-ply.

Sheet size
Manufactured toilet paper sheet in the United States was sized  × . Larger sizes remain available.

Sheet ply
The ply of a toilet paper refers to the number of layers per sheet. Rolls are typically available in single-ply, 2-ply, 3-ply, and 4-ply.

Roll length

Phrases like "single roll", "double roll", "triple roll", "jumbo roll", and "mega roll" commonly used in retail advertising refer to the number of sheets per roll (though the actual number of sheets is also usually disclosed on packaging). A longer roll needs to be replaced less often, but the very largest sizes do not fit all toilet paper dispensers, especially in older homes.

Materials
Toilet paper is usually manufactured from pulpwood trees, but is also sometimes made from sugar cane byproducts or bamboo.

Toilet paper products vary greatly in the distinguishing technical factors, such as size, weight, roughness, softness, chemical residues, "finger-breakthrough" resistance, water-absorption, etc. The larger companies have very detailed, scientific market surveys to determine which marketing sectors require or demand which of the many technical qualities. Modern toilet paper may have a light coating of aloe or lotion or wax worked into the paper to reduce roughness.

Quality is usually determined by the number of plies (stacked sheets), coarseness, and durability. Low grade institutional toilet paper is typically of the lowest grade of paper, has only one or two plies, is very coarse and sometimes contains small amounts of embedded unbleached/unpulped paper; it was typically called "hard" toilet paper. A brand disinfected with carbolic acid was manufactured in Sheffield, United Kingdom under the Izal brand name by Newton Chambers until 1981. Mid-grade two ply is somewhat textured to provide some softness and is somewhat stronger. Premium toilet paper may have lotion and wax and has two to four plies of very finely pulped paper. If it is marketed as "luxury", it may be quilted or rippled (embossed), perfumed, colored or patterned, medicated (with anti-bacterial chemicals), or treated with aloe or other perfumes.

To advance decomposition of the paper in septic tanks or drainage, the paper used has shorter fibres than facial tissue or writing paper. The manufacturer tries to reach an optimal balance between rapid decomposition (which requires shorter fibres) and sturdiness (which requires longer fibres).  Compaction of toilet paper in drain lines, such as in a clog, prevents fibre dispersion and largely halts the breakdown process.

A German quip says that the toilet paper of Nazi Germany was so rough and scratchy that it was almost unusable, so many people used old issues of the Völkischer Beobachter instead, because the paper was softer.

Color and design
Colored toilet paper in colors such as pink, lavender, light blue, light green, purple, green, and light yellow (so that one could choose a color of toilet paper that matched or complemented the color of one's bathroom) was commonly sold in the United States from the 1960s. Up until 2004, Scott was one of the last remaining U.S. manufacturers to still produce toilet paper in beige, blue, and pink. However, the company has since cut production of colored paper altogether.

Today, in the United States, plain unpatterned colored toilet paper has been mostly replaced by patterned toilet paper, normally white, with embossed decorative patterns or designs in various colors and different sizes depending on the brand. Colored toilet paper remains commonly available in some European countries.

Installation

Dispensers

A toilet roll holder, also known as a toilet paper dispenser, is an item that holds a roll of toilet paper. There are at least seven types of holders:

 A horizontal piece of wire mounted on a hinge, hanging from a door or wall.
 A horizontal axle recessed in the wall.
 A vertical axle recessed in the wall
 A horizontal axle mounted on a freestanding frame.
 A freestanding vertical pole on a base.
 A wall mounted dispensing unit, usually containing more than one roll. This is used in the commercial/away-from-home marketplace.
 A wall mounted dispensing unit with tissue interleaved in a "S"-type fold so the user can extract the tissue one sheet at a time.

Some commercial or institutional toilet paper is wrapped around a cylinder to many times the thickness of a standard toilet paper roll.

Orientation

There are two choices of orientation when using a holder with a horizontal axle parallel to the wall: the toilet paper may hang over or under the roll. The choice is largely a matter of personal preference, dictated by habit. In surveys of American consumers and of bath and kitchen specialists, 60–70% of respondents prefer over.  This is said to exhibit Endianness, which applies not only to eggs, but to toilet paper.  Most Americans think it should go over the top, like a waterfall.

Decoration

Toilegami refers to toilet paper origami. Like table napkins, some fancy Japanese hotels fold the first squares of toilet paper on its dispenser to be presented in a fashionable way.

Recreational use

In the United States, toilet paper has been the primary tool in a prank known as "TP-ing" (pronounced "teepeeing"). TP-ing, or "toilet papering", is often favored by adolescents and is the act of throwing rolls of toilet paper over cars, trees, houses and gardens, causing the toilet paper to unfurl and cover the property, creating an inconvenient mess.

Children and cats may unroll an entire roll of toilet paper by spinning it until it completely unravels on the floor, or as a game by children wadding up one end, putting it in the toilet bowl without tearing it and then using the flushing of the toilet to pull new paper into the toilet, with the objective of flushing the entire roll down the toilet section at a time without the toilet paper breaking. Special toilet paper insert holders with an oblong shape were invented to prevent continuous unrolling without tearing to discourage this practice.

Toilet paper pranks include musical toilet paper holders and inserts that are activated by the unrolling of the toilet paper and will loudly play an embarrassing song calling attention to the person defecating.

Other gags include custom toilet paper printed with jokes, stories or politician's images.

Mechanics

Alexander Balankin and coauthors have studied the behavior of toilet paper under tensile stress and during wetting and burning.

Toilet paper has been used in physics education to demonstrate the concepts of torque, moment of inertia, and angular momentum; and the conservation of momentum and energy.

Environmental considerations

One tree produces about 800 rolls of toilet paper and about 83 million rolls are produced per day. Global toilet paper production consumes 27,000 trees daily.

More than seven billion rolls of toilet paper are sold yearly in the United States alone. This figure is about 50% more than the average of other Western countries or Japan. The higher use in the United States may be explained by the fact that other countries people use bidets or spray hoses to clean themselves. Millions of trees are harvested in North and South America leaving ecological footprint concerns. 

, between 22% and 48% of the toilet paper used in the United States comes from tree farms in the U.S. and South America, with the rest mostly coming from old, second growth forests, and, some from virgin forests.

Alternatives to virgin wood pulp
Toilet paper made from recycled paper avoids the direct environmental impact of cutting down trees, and is commercially available.  Recycled newspaper can contain BPA, an endocrine disruptor.

Toilet paper produced from bamboo is commercially available, and is in some ways more environmentally friendly than virgin pulpwood, because bamboo grows faster, taking less land and less water. For North American consumers, the Natural Resources Defense Council recommends recycled tree pulp over bamboo toilet paper, because tree forests promote more biodiversity and bamboo products must be shipped from Asia.

Toilet paper produced from bagasse, a byproduct of sugarcane, is commercially available, and avoids cutting down any plants because sugarcane is already grown for sugar production.

The most environmentally friendly alternatives are to rely solely on soap and water for anal hygiene.

See also
 Anal hygiene
 Fresh'n
 Xylospongium, an ancient equivalent

Citations

General sources 

 
 
 
 
 
 
 Needham, Joseph (1986). Science and Civilization in China: Volume 5, Chemistry and Chemical Technology, Part 1, Paper and Printing. Taipei: Caves Books, Ltd.

Further reading

External links 

 The Whole World Toilet Paper Museum
 Wiping Correctly

 
Hygiene
Toilets
Domestic implements
Chinese inventions
Sanitation